The French International School of Oregon is a French and English language private school in Portland, Oregon, United States.

The school was founded by Jean Claude and Maarja Paris in 1979. It has an annual operating budget of over $7 million. Approximately 92 percent of operating revenue is generated by tuition, with other operations and fundraising activities accounting for the remaining 8 percent.

A partner school, the German American School, is located in Portland and serves grades K-5. Its graduates may elect to attend middle school at French International, in order to receive German-language instruction in language arts and social studies.

Community participation is emphasized at the French International School of Oregon. In 2012, three high school women who learned French at French International assisted with a World War II translation project about "a B-17 crash in the Alps near the French-Italian border." A cookbook by the Families and Friends of French International,  : A Compendium of World Recipes, has been favorably reviewed for its use of local food and focus on bringing young people into the kitchen to cook. The school has received Audubon Society certification for "removal of invasive weeds and practicing wildlife stewardship," and a City Commissioner complimented its students for providing "sophisticated ideas and articulate comments" on the 2010 Portland Plan.

See also
 Agency for French Education Abroad
 Education in France
 American School of Paris - An American international school in France

References

AEFE accredited schools
French-American culture in Portland, Oregon
Private elementary schools in Oregon
Private middle schools in Oregon
French-language education
1979 establishments in Oregon
International schools in Oregon
International Baccalaureate schools in Oregon